Friedersdorf (bei Königs Wusterhausen) station is a railway station in the Friedersdorf district in the municipality of Heidesee, located in the Dahme-Spreewald district in Brandenburg, Germany.

References

Railway stations in Brandenburg
Buildings and structures in Dahme-Spreewald